This is a list of tunnels and bridges in Hong Kong.

Road

Road tunnels

Victoria Harbour crossings

Tunnels on Hong Kong Island

Tunnels in New Kowloon

Tunnels between New Kowloon and the New Territories

Tunnels in the New Territories

Tunnels under construction or planned

Notable underpasses 

 Pedder Street Underpass
 Smithfield Underpass
 Salisbury Road Underpass
Chung Cheung Road
Lin Cheung Road Underpass
 Man Cheung Street Underpass 
Winslow Street Underpass
Chatham Road South-Gilles Avenue South Underpass
Sai Sha Road Ma On Shan Underpass
Sai Sha Road Clear Water Bay Underpass
Tsing Yi Road-Kwai Tsing Bridge Underpass
Yi Pei Chun Road Underpass
Wo Yi Hop Road Underpass
 Austin Road West Underpass

Road bridges 

There are about 1300 vehicular bridges in Hong Kong.

Other road bridges and viaducts 

 Banyan Bridge  
 Bridge on Bowen Road
 
 Castle Peak Road — New Tai Lam
 
 Dragon Bridge
 Hung Hom Bypass
 Island Eastern Corridor
 Kwun Tong Bypass
 Lai Chi Kok Bridge
 Lion Bridge
  (cross-border)
 
 New Clear Water Bay Road
 Sand Martin Bridge
 Tsing Yi North Coastal Road
 Tsuen Wan Road
Former bridges
Kwong Fuk Bridge

Pedestrian-only

Footbridges 
 Kwong Fuk Bridge over Lam Tsuen River
 Footbridge over Leighton Road
 Lek Yuen Bridge over Shing Mun River Channel
 Footbridge between Lo Wu Control Point and Luohu Port (cross-border; over Sham Chun River)
 Footbridge between Lok Ma Chau Spur Line Control Point and Futian Port (cross-border; over Sham Chun River)
 Several masonry bridges of Pokfulam Reservoir
 A masonry bridge of Tai Tam Upper Reservoir
 Several masonry bridges of Tai Tam Tuk Reservoir

Railway

Railway tunnels 
Various tunnels were built for the KCR network now leased to the MTRC:
 Beacon Hill Tunnel
 Tunnel No. 5
 Tsuen Wan line immersed tube
 Tunnel No. 1A
 Tunnel No. 5A
 Eastern Harbour Crossing
 Lok Ma Chau Spur Line
 Kwai Tsing Tunnels (Tsing Tsuen Tunnels and Ha Kwai Chung Tunnels)
 Tai Lam Tunnel (Tuen Ma line)

Tunnels of the MTR:
 Airport Railway immersed tube
 Nam Fung Tunnel
 Lei Tung Tunnel
 Tunnels between Tsing Yi station and Tsing Ma Bridge
 Tunnel to the west of Kap Shui Mun Bridge

Tunnels owned by the KCRC leased to the MTRC:
 Lion Rock Tunnel (Tuen Ma line)
 East Rail line Cross-Harbour extension (Shatin to Central Link Cross-Harbour section; Contract 1121)

Underground sections of MTR:
 Kwun Tong line: 
Whampoa - Choi Hung
 Lam Tin - Tiu Keng Leng (Black Hill Tunnels)
 Tsuen Wan line:
 Central - Lai King
 Around Tai Wo Hau
 Island line: Kennedy Town - Heng Fa Chuen
 Tuen Ma line: Hin Keng - Tsuen Wan West (including Lion Rock Tunnel mentioned above; after Tsuen Wan West the railway line continue onto Tai Lam Tunnel and Kwai Tsing Tunnels mentioned above), except for the section near Nam Cheong and Hung Hom
 Tseung Kwan O line: Entire line (except a short section between Lohas Park and Pak Shing Kok Tunnel)
High-speed rail:
 Hong Kong Express Rail Link: Entire line
Former tunnels:
 Tunnel No. 1
 Tunnel No. 3
 Tunnel No. 4
Old Beacon Hill Tunnel
 A tunnel near Tong To Village on the former Sha Tau Kok Railway

The Hong Kong International Airport Automated People Mover also features tunnel portions.

Railway bridges and viaducts

MTR

East Rail line / Through Train 

 Lo Wu Bridge
 Bridge over Lam Tsuen River
 Bridge over Tai Po River (three tracks)
 Bridge over Tai Wai Nullah
 Bridge over Fo Tan Nullah (five tracks)
 Bridge over Cheung Shui Tam (near the junction of Yau King Lane and Cheung Tai Road; decommissioned)

Island line 
 Heng Fa Chuen - Chai Wan Viaduct

Kwun Tong line 
 Kowloon Bay - Lam Tin Viaduct

Tuen Ma line 
 Tai Wai - Shek Mun Viaduct (including a section over the Siu Lek Yuen Nullah)
 Tai Shui Hang - Wu Kai Sha Viaduct 
 A road-rail bridge (with Ma On Shan Road) over Nui Po Tung Hang 
 Kam Sheung Road–Tuen Mun Viaduct (longest bridge/viaduct in Hong Kong)

South Island line 
 Ocean Park - Wong Chuk Hang Viaduct
 Aberdeen Channel Bridge

Tsuen Wan line 
 Kwai Fong - Kwai Hing Viaduct

Lantau Railway (Tung Chung line / Airport Express) 
 Kap Shui Mun Bridge
 Ma Wan Viaduct
 Tsing Lai Bridge
 Tsing Ma Bridge
 Railway bridge between Lantau Island & Chek Lap Kok Island

Light Rail 
 Hoi Wong Road over Tuen Mun River
 Castle Peak Road - Hung Shui Kiu over Hung Shui River
 Castle Peak Road - Yuen Long over Yuen Long Nullah
 Pui To Road over Tuen Mun River
 Fung Tei Station to Siu Hong Station over Tuen Mun River
 Bridge across the junction of Tin Wah Road and Tin Shui Road

Peak Tram 
 Bridge over Kennedy Road

Tram 
 Bowrington Bridge over Bowrington Canal (subsumed)

Former Sha Tau Kok Railway 
 Various bridges, including one in Wo Hang, one in Shek Au Chung and another in Ma Tseuk Leng

Others

Other tunnels

Drainage tunnels 
Hong Kong West Drainage Tunnel 
 Po Shan Drainage Tunnel
Lai Chi Kok Drainage Tunnel
Tsuen Wan Drainage Tunnel

Tunnels for electricity cables 

 Nam Fung–Parker Tunnel
 Wah Fu–Bowen Tunnel
 Castle Peak Cable Tunnel
 Sham Tseng to Ma Wan Cable Crossing
 Lantau to Ma Wan Cable Crossing

Tunnels for gas pipes 

Old Beacon Hill Tunnel
Braemar Hill Tunnel

Tunnels for seawater cooling 
 Hongkong Bank Seawater Tunnel
 The Excelsior Seawater Tunnel (pipes removed)

Sewerage tunnels 
Harbour Area Treatment Scheme - two tunnels beneath Victoria Harbour
Tolo Harbour Effluent Export Scheme

Water supplies tunnels 
 High Island Water Tunnels
 between Kowloon Byewash Reservoir and Lower Shing Mun Reservoir
 Kornhill Tunnel
Lion Rock Tunnel
 Second Lion Rock Tunnel
 Pok Fu Lam Tunnel
 Shek Pik Scheme Water Tunnels
Tai Lam Chung Tunnels (Tai Lam Chung to Chai Wan Kok to Tsing Lung Tau)
Tai Tam Tunnel (Tai Tam to Wong Nai Chung)
 Tung Chung Tunnel

Mining tunnels 

Lin Ma Hang
Ma On Shan
West Brother Island

Other bridges 
 A series of aqueducts on the 
 Bowen Aqueduct
 Tai Tam Upper Reservoir Masonry Aqueduct

See also 

 Transport in Hong Kong
 Vehicular harbour crossings in Hong Kong
 List of railway bridges and viaducts in Hong Kong
 Hong Kong–Zhuhai–Macau Bridge
:Category:Railway tunnels in Hong Kong

References

External links 
 Transport Department: Tunnels & Bridges in Hong Kong
 Civil Engineering Department: Catalogue of Hong Kong Tunnels (Up to December 2008)
 Civil Engineering Department: Geotechnical Control of Tunnel Works – CEDD Newsletter Issue No.30

tunnels and bridges
 
Hong Kong
Hong Kong
 
tunnels and bridges
Railway bridges in Hong Kong
Hong Kong, railway bridges and viaducts

zh:香港橋樑
zh:香港隧道